Welcome Stadium is an 11,000-seat multi-purpose stadium in Dayton, Ohio, United States, owned and operated by Dayton Public Schools. Primary tenants of the facility include University of Dayton Flyers football team and the Dayton Dynamo of the National Premier Soccer League.

History 
It opened in 1949, and is home to all of the city's high schools. Since 1974, it has also been home to the Dayton Flyers football team. It hosted the 1961 Aviation Bowl and the Ohio High School State Track and Field finals for the years 1999–2003. It hosted the USA Outdoor Track and Field Championships Men's division in 1953 and 1957 the Women's division in 1963 and 1969.  It also hosts Ohio's High School (OMEA) marching band finals in late October, early November. Soccer club Dayton Dynamo were tenants.

On July 27, 2019, the stadium hosted a Cincinnati Bengals training camp. The event was part of commemorations of the National Football League's official centennial season, paying tribute to one of its charter franchises—the Dayton Triangles. The team and NFL originally aimed for the camp to be held on new turf at the Triangles' former home field, Triangle Park (site of the NFL's first game), but the construction was called off after the discovery of a "unique and sizable anomaly" on the site in an archaeological survey.

See also 
 List of NCAA Division I FCS football stadiums

References 

College football venues
High school football venues in Ohio
Dayton Flyers football
High school football venues in the United States
Defunct NCAA bowl game venues
Sports venues in Dayton, Ohio
Multi-purpose stadiums in the United States
National Premier Soccer League stadiums
Soccer venues in Ohio
1949 establishments in Ohio
Sports venues completed in 1949